Martin Hudson may refer to:

Martin Hudson, character in 8 Seconds
Martin Hudson (political candidate) for Broxbourne (UK Parliament constituency)
Martin Hudson, of the Classic Rock Society